Long Mountain may refer to:

Geography

Jamaica
Long Mountain (Jamaica), a mountain in the Kingston area

United Kingdom
Long Mountain (Powys), on the borders of Powys, Wales and Shropshire, England

United States
Long Mountain (Hampshire County, Massachusetts)
Long Mountain, just west of Tuxedo, North Carolina
Long Mountain in Hardy County, West Virginia

Other
Long Mountain (radar), Taiwanese air defense and BMD radar

See also 
De Long Mountains, Alaska, United States
Langeberg, a mountain range in South Africa
Long Mynd, Shropshire, England
Long Range Mountains, Newfoundland, Canada